Igor Viktorovich Kovalenko (born 29 December 1988, Novomoskovsk) is a Ukrainian chess player who played for Latvia between 2013 and 2021 and holds the FIDE title of Grandmaster (GM).

Kovalenko was awarded the titles of International Master (IM) in 2008 and Grandmaster (GM) in 2011. He won the Latvian Chess Championship in 2013 and 2014. In 2016, Kovalenko came second in the European Individual Chess Championship in Gjakova (Kosovo). In 2019, he won the Riga Technical University Open.

Igor Kovalenko played for Latvia in Chess Olympiads:
 in 2014, at the second board in the 41st Chess Olympiad in Tromsø (+5 −2 =4),
 in 2016, at the second board in the 42nd Chess Olympiad in Baku (+6 −1 =4),
 in 2018, at the first board in the 43rd Chess Olympiad in Batumi (+6 −3 =0).

Igor Kovalenko played for Latvia in the European Team Chess Championship:
 in 2015, at the second board in Reykjavik (+3 −1 =3).

References

External links

1988 births
Living people
Latvian chess players
Ukrainian chess players
Chess grandmasters